Taxes in Iceland are levied by the state and the municipalities. Property rights are strong and Iceland is one of the few countries where they are applied to fishery management. Taxpayers pay various subsidies to each other, similar to European countries that are welfare states, but the spending is less than in most European countries. Despite low tax rates in relation to European welfare states, overall taxation and consumption is still much higher than in countries such as Ireland. Employment regulations are relatively flexible. The tax is collected by Skatturinn, the Iceland Revenue and Customs Agency and is due in March each year.

Income tax

Income tax is deducted at the source, which is called pay-as-you-earn (PAYE). Each employee has a personal tax credit of 53,895 ISK per month (2018) which is deducted from calculated taxes. Unused credit may be transferred to one's spouse. Mandatory employee pension insurance is 4% of gross income (employer provides a minimum of 8%) and another 4% of total income may be deducted for private pension insurance (if so, the employer is obliged to pay additional 2% premium for the benefit of the employees) .

Before the year 2016 Iceland used a 3-tier income tax system base on the individual's level of income. Since 2016, Iceland uses a 2-tier system.

In 2018 income tax consisted as follows

If the annual income of an individual is below 1,750,782 ISK there must not be any income or municipal tax paid. The annual personal tax credit (646,740 ISK, 2018) equals to non-taxation of the first 1,750,782 ISK

Children under 16 years must pay 6% income tax if their annual income exceeds 180,000 ISK.

Tax on capital gains
Individuals in Iceland pay 22% capital gains tax (2018)

Corporate tax
The corporate income tax rate in Iceland stands at 20% since 2011, one of the lowest in the world. These 20% stand for limited liability companies and limited partnership companies. Corporate income tax for other types of legal entities (e.g. partnerships) is assessed at a rate of 37.6%. Non-resident corporations doing business in Iceland are subject to the same rate as applies to resident corporations.

Value-added tax
The standard rate of value-added tax is 24%. A number of specific consumer goods and services are subject to a reduced VAT rate of 11% (e.g. food, hotels, newspapers, books, and energy like electricity, heating and fuel).

Residence in Iceland 
For taxation purposes a resident of Iceland is anyone who is present in Iceland for 183 days during any 12-month period. An individual that stays in Iceland for longer than 183  days is considered to be a resident from the day of arrival. After leaving Iceland tax liability of an individual ends.

Non-residents staying in Iceland for a period shorter than 183 days are subject to national income tax on any income. They are also subject to municipal income tax as well as residents.

References